Shimmer and Shine is an American animated television series, created by Farnaz Esnaashari-Charmatz. It airs on Nickelodeon in the United States and on Treehouse in Canada. It premiered on Nickelodeon on August 24, 2015, and three seasons of the series have aired. Each season contains twenty episodes, not including an unaired pilot from 2013. The first season used hand-drawn animation, with the series switching to CGI animation with its second season.

Shimmer and Shine was ordered to series by Nickelodeon in March 2014, with the first season to consist of 20 episodes. On February 11, 2016, it was announced that the series was renewed for a 20-episode second season, which premiered on June 15, 2016, and switched to CGI. On June 21, 2016, it was renewed for a third season to consist of 20 episodes, which premiered on May 5, 2017. On May 24, 2017, Shimmer and Shine was renewed for a fourth season also to consist of 20 episodes, which premiered on October 20, 2018.

Series overview

Episodes

Season 1 (2015–16)
This is the only season to use 2D animation.

Season 2 (2016–17)
Starting with this season, the remainder of the series now uses CGI animation, with the addition of two eleven-minute segments each (except for "Welcome to Zahramay Falls" and "The Pirate Genie"), rather than usually a 22-minute episode. This season introduces new characters such as Princess Samira, the ruler of Zahramay Falls, and her pet peacock Roya, Kaz (Zac's new genie) and his pet Ziffilon Zain, Princess Samira's Mentor, Empress Caliana, and Leah's magical pet fox, Parisa. This season also introduces the series' first antagonists, Zeta the Sorceress and her pet dragon Nazboo. Shimmer and Shine's role as Leah's genies is also revealed to Zac. Leah and Zac also gain the ability to visit Zahramay Falls and go on adventures with their genies. This season also introduces genie gems which are magical gems with various powers. It is also revealed that Leah and Zac's wishes are the result of wish magic, a powerful type of magic which genies use to grant wishes. While powerful, wish magic is shown to have various limitations, which cause it to fail or not work correctly. 

 Mia Hope replaces Elie Simons from taking the role of Shine in the British voice cast.

Season 3 (2017–18)

Season 4 (2018–20)

Music videos
Treehouse TV debuted two in September 2017: Music Video 1 on Friday the 8th and Music Video 2 on Saturday the 9th.

Notes

References

Shimmer and Shine
Shimmer and Shine